The Battle of Alsace was a military campaign between the Allies and the Germans in Alsace, eastern France, from 20 November 1944 to 19 March 1945.

References

See also
 Lorraine campaign
 Operation Nordwind

Alsace
Alsace
History of Alsace